Foreign Office may refer to:

 Foreign and Commonwealth Office, a department of the United Kingdom Government commonly called "Foreign Office"
 Foreign Office (Germany)
 United States Department of State

See also
Ministry of Foreign Affairs